Winnie the Pooh Discovers the Seasons is an educational short film produced by Rick Reinert Productions for Walt Disney Productions' educational media division released in September, 1981.

Plot 
Christopher Robin presents Pooh with an interesting new gift—a calendar. Pooh has never seen one before, and Christopher Robin explains that it is a way of keeping track of the days, weeks, months and seasons. The calendar stops at each season, as we watch Pooh, Piglet, Eeyore, Rabbit and Owl in the Hundred Acre Wood exploring the world around them and noticing the changes. Among them: the water in the pond becomes hard and slick when it gets cold in the winter and becomes refreshing and fun to swim in when it gets warm in the summer.

Cast 
 Hal Smith as Winnie the Pooh and Owl
 Kim Christianson as Christopher Robin
 Ray Erlenborn as Rabbit
 Laurie Main as the Narrator
 John Fiedler as Piglet
 Ron Feinberg as Eeyore

Production 
This was the first time that Hal Smith voiced Winnie the Pooh. Smith would voice the character until 1988 when Jim Cummings took over the role for The New Adventures of Winnie the Pooh. The short's director, Rick Reinert, had previously directed A Nutrition Adventure, another Walt Disney Educational short. Disney contracted the work on this short out to Reinert's production company, Rick Reinert Productions, in lieu of producing it in-house. Reinert would go on to direct 1983's Winnie the Pooh and a Day for Eeyore.

External links 
 Winnie the Pooh Discovers the Seasons at The Big Cartoon Database

References List 

1980s English-language films
1981 short films
1981 animated films
1980s Disney animated short films
Winnie-the-Pooh films
Films about toys
Disney educational films
Animated films set in England
Winnie the Pooh (franchise)
1980s educational films
American animated short films